Nusrat Faria (née Faria Shetu; born 8 September) is a Bangladeshi film actress, singer, television presenter and radio jockey who works in Bangladesh and India. She has many super hits films like Aashique, Badsha the Don and Boss 2. She played the role of Sheikh Hasina in Bongobondhu Biopic.

Early life
Faria had planned to be an army officer, before she became an actress.

Career
Faria started her career as a debater participating in a BTV debate show. She is a national debate champions in 2010 and 2011. She started her career in show business as a model in several television commercials. Throughout her career, she has worked in various television commercials and radio programs. In 2014, she hosted a reality show, Fair and Handsome: The Ultimate Man.
She signed with Jaaz Multimedia to appear in two films, titled Aashiqui and Hero 420. The former, being her debut film, released in late 2015 while the latter released in early 2016. The former also earned Faria a Meril Prothom Alo Award for Best Newcomer in film or television. Both films were Indo-Bangladeshi joint ventures, being co-produced by Eskay Movies.

In 2016, Faria also starred in another Indo-Bangladeshi co-production, Badsha - The Don, directed by Baba Yadav. The film also starred popular Indian actor Jeet, and is considered a turning point in Faria's career, earning Faria a Tele Cine Award for Best Actress from Bangladesh.

After starring Indo-Bangladeshi films for the past two years, Faria then starred in two Bangladeshi films in 2017, Premi o Premi and Dhat Teri Ki. Faria also recorded dialogue for Detective, Bangladesh's first animated film. All three of these films were produced by Jaaz Multimedia and also starred Arifin Shuvo.

In 2017, Faria returned with the team behind Badsha - The Don for the film Boss 2: Back to Rule, again directed by Baba Yadav, produced by Jaaz Multimedia and starring Jeet. The film is a sequel to the 2013 film Boss: Born to Rule and also stars Subhashree Ganguly. The film is also an Indo-Bangladeshi joint venture, being co-produced by Walzen Media Works and Jeet's production company, Jeetz Filmworks. Initially rejecting the film, Faria later agreed to starring in the film when she read the script, describing her character as layered and an opportunity to show off her acting prowess, also calling the character a trendsetter. Faria also came under criticism for her costume in the music video for the song "Rj Rock" from Boss 2, a song which was also criticized for its lyrics. She performed for a music video, 'Pataka', written by Rakib Rahul and composed by Pritom Hasan.

In 2021, she completed her bachelor's degree in law from the University of London.

Filmography

Film

Television

Radio

Music videos

Awards and nominations

References

External links
 
 
 
 

Living people
Bangladeshi actresses
Bangladeshi film actresses
Bengali television actresses
Actresses in Bengali cinema
Bangladeshi expatriate actresses in India
Bangladeshi female models
Bangladeshi pop singers
CJFB Performance Award Winners
Alumni of the University of London
Year of birth missing (living people)
21st-century Bangladeshi actresses
21st-century Bangladeshi women singers